Mario Topuzov (born 25 July 1999) is a Bulgarian footballer who currently plays as a midfielder for CSKA 1948 Sofia.

Career

Pirin Blagoevgrad
In June 2016, Topuzov started pre-season training with Pirin Blagoevgrad's first team. On 5 March 2017, he made his professional debut in a 0–3 away loss against Ludogorets Razgrad, coming on as substitute for Stanislav Kostov.

References

External links

Living people
1999 births
Bulgarian footballers
Association football midfielders
First Professional Football League (Bulgaria) players
OFC Pirin Blagoevgrad players
FC Septemvri Simitli players
FC CSKA 1948 Sofia players